James Michael "J. T." Taylor (born August 12, 1956 in Peoria, Illinois) is a former American football offensive tackle in the National Football League. He was drafted by the New Orleans Saints in the second round of the 1978 NFL Draft. He played college football at Missouri.

1956 births
Living people
American football offensive tackles
Missouri Tigers football players
New Orleans Saints players